John Faye (born 1966) is a singer-songwriter from Newark, Delaware. John first rose to the spotlight as front man of The Caulfields, who were signed to A&M Records from 1995 to 1997 He has also been involved with a few other projects in the Philadelphia area, most notably with IKE and as half of the duo John & Brittany from 2011 until their final show on October 17, 2014. John attended the University of Delaware and graduated with a degree in English. John's new backing band goes by the name "Those Meddling Kids".

Discography 
John Faye/Solo
 Meddling Kid (2015)
With The Caulfields
 Whirlgig (1995)
 L (1997)
 B-Sides and Rarities 1993–1997 (2005)

With John & Brittany"John & Brittany: Full Story"
 John & Brittany (EP) (2011)
 Start Sinning (2013)
 Crookedletta, Crookedletta (2013)
 Stories to be Told (EP) (2014)

With IKE
 Parallel Universe (2003)
 Bumper Sticker Wisdom (DVD)(2004)
 In Real Life (2005)
 Where to Begin (2008)
 Tie The Knot With All That You Got (2009)
 The Little People, Church & The Steeple (2011)
 The Other Shoe Always Drops (Benefit Single – 2013)

With John Faye Power Trip
 John Faye Power Trip (1999)

References

American alternative rock musicians
University of Delaware alumni
Musicians from Newark, New Jersey
American rock singers
American male singers
1966 births
Living people